Emmanuel Kwaku Akyeampong (born 1962) is a professor of history and African and African American studies, and the Oppenheimer Faculty Director of the Harvard University Center for African Studies at Harvard University. He is a faculty associate for the Weatherhead Center for International Affairs, a previous board member of the W. E. B. Du Bois Institute, and has also previously held a prestigious Harvard College Professorship.

As a former (2002–06) Chair of the Committee on African Studies (now the Center of African Studies, under the leadership of founding director Caroline Elkins), Akyeampong was instrumental, along with Henry Louis Gates and multiple other faculty members at Harvard University, in shaping the Department of African and African American Studies at Harvard. Akyeampong's research focuses on West African history, Islam in sub-Saharan Africa, disease and medicine, ecology, the African diaspora, political economy and trade.

Originally from Ghana, Akyeampong earned his B.A. from the University of Ghana in 1984, M.A. in European history from Wake Forest University in 1989, and Ph.D. in African history from the University of Virginia in 1993.

References

Harvard University faculty
21st-century Ghanaian historians
Living people
Ghanaian academics
Ghanaian expatriates in the United States
University of Ghana alumni
Wake Forest University alumni
University of Virginia alumni
Black studies scholars
1962 births
African diaspora studies scholars